The Underdog Project is a German dance group which launched its first album, It Doesn't Matter in 2001. Their hits include "Saturday" (not to be confused with "Saturday Night"; this was not released until two years after the album had come out), "Summer Jam" and "Tonight". The band has four members: Vic Krishna (vocals), Craig Smart (vocals), DJ Frank (remixes) and AJ Duncan (keyboards).

Career 
The band was formed when Canadian artist Vic Krishna was visiting Germany and had a jam session with Canadian singer Craig Smart and the production team of ToneDef and Triple S. It went well, so they started recording; mostly demo tapes, but also full-fledged tracks. When there was enough material for an album, It Doesn't Matter was the end result.

The group's most popular track, "Summer Jam", was one of the biggest pop hits in Europe. At one point, it was on the rotation list of every pop radio station in Germany. It also received much attention in the UK and US. "Summer Jam" reached a high of #2 on the German pop charts. MTV Germany and VIVA both supported the video, adding even more exposure. The biggest dance radio station in New York City, WKTU, also expressed support for the record and added it to their playlist, as well as market leader Power 96 in Miami. In addition to the original set of mixes, new mixes of the song have been completed by various remixers to enhance the record's appeal to a wider variety of club DJs. Most notable is the Dance Movement Extended Mix, done by Nitelite Record's Max Maroldo. The record became a Top 20 pop hit in Italy. Other new mixes included a 2-step garage version, DJ Wickel's 2-Step Mix, a Dutch trance version, 'Greenfields Pancake Jam', and progressive house versions, 'Free Heads Club Mix' & 'Free Heads Dub'.

Discography

Studio albums

Singles

References

Musical groups established in 2000
German dance music groups
German pop music groups